Ice Road is a novel written by South African-born Gillian Slovo. It was shortlisted for the Orange Prize for Fiction. Set in Leningrad in the 1930s, the story about power in Stalinist Russia is narrated by Irina Davydovna, a cleaning lady.

External links
Review, 5 June 2004

2004 novels
Political novels
Novels by Gillian Slovo
Novels set in Russia